Arif Erdem (born 2 January 1972) is a Turkish retired football manager and former professional player who played in the forward position. Starting out with local club Zeytinburnuspor in 1990, Erdem had a decorated 15-year professional career. He scored 106 goals in 341 league matches and finished joint top scorer (Gol Kralı) of the Süper Lig with İlhan Mansız at the conclusion of the 2001–02 season.

During his 14 years with Galatasaray, Erdem won seven Süper Lig titles and five Turkish Cup titles, as well as the UEFA Cup in 2000. He was a part of the Turkey national team that finished third at the 2002 FIFA World Cup. Erdem was capped 60 times, scoring eleven goals.

He managed İstanbul Büyükşehir Belediyespor from 2011 to 2012.

Club career
Erdem played for Zeytinburnuspor before signing his first professional contract with Galatasaray on 1 June 1991. He made 29 total appearances in his first season with the club, scoring four goals. Erdem made fewer appearances the following season, providing four goals in 18 appearances as the club achieved a domestic treble (Süper Lig, Turkish Cup, and Turkish Super Cup). The next season, 1993–94, was Erdem's most successful to date. His nine goals in the league helped Galatasaray earn another league title. Erdem finished his first stint with Galatasaray after winning the 1999–2000 UEFA Cup, totaling six league titles, four cup titles, and four other cup titles.

Erdem left Galatasaray for Real Sociedad at the start of the 2000–01. However, he regretted joining the club, saying "the only thing I wanted was to move to a European team... I didn't even think about it, I signed the first offer I received." Erdem was plagued by injuries during his tenure, and he left the Spanish club after six months, scoring one goal in two appearances. He signed with Galatasaray on 14 November 2000. The following season, Erdem won the Gol Kralı award, an award given to the top scorer of the Süper Lig, en route to his seventh league title with the club. Erdem closed out his professional career with a Turkish Cup win in 2004–05.

International career
Erdem began his international career with the Turkey U21 national team in 1991, scoring one goal in 10 caps. He participated in the Akdeniz Cup with the Turkish Olympic team in 1993, and earned his first senior team cap in 1994. His senior international career lasted from 1994 to 2003, where he scored 11 goals in 60 appearances.

Coaching career
Erdem had been an assistant coach with İstanbul Büyükşehir Belediyespor since 2006. On 18 November 2011, after the assignation of Abdullah Avcı to Turkey national football team, he became the new head coach of İstanbul Büyükşehir Belediyespor. At the end of the season, his contract was terminated by club at 14 May 2012.

Personal life
Erdem is of Albanian descent. Arif Erdem reportedly fled to Greece in 2016 after the failed Turkish coup of 2016, due to his supposed links to the Gülen movement, categorized by the Turkish government as a terrorist organization.

Career statistics

Club

International goals
Scores and results list Turkey's goal tally first, score column indicates score after each Erdem goal.

Managerial statistics

Honours
Galatasaray
 Süper Lig: 1992–93, 1993–94, 1996–97, 1997–98, 1998–99, 1999–2000, 2001–02
 Turkish Cup: 1992–93, 1995–96, 1998–99, 1999–2000, 2004–05
 Turkish Super Cup: 1992–93, 1995–96, 1996–97
 Chancellor Cup: 1994–95
 UEFA Cup: 1999–2000

Turkey
FIFA World Cup third place: 2002

Individual
 Gol Kralı: 2001–02 (21 goals)

References

External links
 
 

1972 births
Living people
Footballers from Istanbul
Turkish people of Albanian descent
Turkish footballers
Turkey international footballers
Turkey under-21 international footballers
Süper Lig players
La Liga players
Zeytinburnuspor footballers
Galatasaray S.K. footballers
Real Sociedad footballers
UEFA Euro 1996 players
UEFA Euro 2000 players
2002 FIFA World Cup players
Turkish expatriate footballers
Turkish expatriate sportspeople in Spain
Süper Lig managers
Expatriate footballers in Spain
Association football forwards
UEFA Cup winning players
Mediterranean Games gold medalists for Turkey
Mediterranean Games medalists in football
Competitors at the 1993 Mediterranean Games
Turkish football managers